Pervaiz Rashid is a Pakistani politician, and the former Federal Minister of Information, Broadcasting, and National Heritage and  Minister for Law, Justice and Human Rights in the Third Sharif ministry. A member of Pakistan Muslim League (Nawaz), Rashid has been a member of the Senate of Pakistan since 2009 and previously served as the Chairman of the Pakistan Television Corporation from 1997 to 1999 during the Sharif's government in 1997.

Political career
Rashid started his political career as a student leader from Pakistan Peoples Party student wing, PSF, from Gordon College Rawalpindi.

Later he joined PML-N and was elected member of the Senate in 1997 on PML-N party ticket. He was made Chairman Pakistan Television Corporation in 1997. He was arrested by the army after the 1999 Musharraf takeover and jailed.

He was sworn in as Federal Minister for Information and Broadcasting in June 2013. In November 2013, he was given the additional charge of Minister of Law, Justice and Human Rights.

He was re-elected to the Senate of Pakistan as a candidate of PML (N) in 2015 Pakistani Senate election.

He was made to resign in October 2016 from his position as Minister for Information, Broadcasting and National Heritage following the report which alleged his involvement in leaking contents of a high-profile security meeting.

References

|-

1950 births
Pakistan Muslim League (N) politicians
Living people
Pakistani television directors
Pakistan Television Corporation executives
Pakistani television writers
Pakistani broadcasters
Pakistani media executives
Pakistani political writers
Government Gordon College alumni
Pakistani senators (14th Parliament)